Michael or Mike Ryan may refer to:

Arts and entertainment 
 Michael M. Ryan (1929–2017), American actor best known for his role as John Randolph on Another World
 Rocky Ryan or Michael Ryan (1937–2004), British media hoaxer
 Michael Ryan (broadcaster) (born 1944), presented RTÉ's Nationwide programme for many years
 Michael Ryan (poet) (born 1946), American poet
 Mike Ryan (musician) (born 1988), country music artist from Texas
 Michael Ryan (actor) (active since 1998), British actor featuring in Kelly + Victor and Serena
 Michael Ryan (artist) (active since 2004), comic book artist on various American comics, including Runaways
 Mike S. Ryan (fl. 2006–2007), American film producer

Politics 
 Michael Patrick Ryan (1825–1893), Irish-born Quebec businessman and political figure
 Michael J. Ryan (Philadelphia politician) (1862–1943), president of the United Irish League
 Michael J. Ryan (Irish politician) (died 1952), Irish barrister, professor and politician

Sports

Association football (soccer)
 Mike Ryan (footballer, born 1930) (1930–2006), English footballer for Lincoln City and York City
 Mike Ryan (soccer coach) (1935–2012), Irish-American soccer coach
 Mike Ryan (footballer, born 1979), English footballer for Wrexham

Baseball
 Mike Ryan (third baseman) (1868–1935), American baseball player
 Mike Ryan (catcher) (1941–2020), American baseball player
 Michael Ryan (baseball) (born 1977), America baseball outfielder

Hurling
 Michael Ryan (hurler, born 1955), retired Irish hurler and manager of the Westmeath hurling team
 Michael Ryan (hurler, born 1970), retired Irish hurler and manager of the Tipperary hurling team

Other sports
 Michael Ryan (hurdler) (1941–2017), Australian Olympic hurdler
 Michael J. Ryan (athlete) (1889–1971), winner of the 1912 Boston Marathon
 Mike Ryan (athlete) (born 1941), former New Zealand marathon and long-distance runner
 Michael Ryan (fencer) (born 1943), Irish Olympic fencer
 Michael Ryan (equestrian) (born 1976), Irish Olympic equestrian
 Michael Ryan (ice hockey) (born 1980), American ice hockey forward
 Michael Ryan (rugby league) (born 1981), Australian rugby league player for the Brisbane Broncos

Others
 Michael Ryan (printer) (1784-1830), Canadian publisher and editor of the Barbados Globe.
 Michael Ryan (physician) (1800–1840), British physician and author
 Michael Clarkson Ryan (1820–1861), American attorney who was one of eight founders of Beta Theta Pi
 Michael Kennedy Ryan (1868–1925), Irish Catholic priest, teacher and supporter of the Gaelic Athletic Association
 Michael P. Ryan (USMC) (1916–2005), United States Marine Corps general
 Michael E. Ryan (born 1941), former Chief of Staff of the United States Air Force
 Michael D. Ryan (1945–2012), associate justice of the Arizona Supreme Court
 Michael W. Ryan (1948–2015), death row inmate in Nebraska
 Michael Ryan (chef) (born 1953), Irish Michelin starred head chef of Arbutus Lodge
 Michael Ryan (mass murderer) (1960–1987), perpetrator of the Hungerford massacre
 Michael J. Ryan (doctor) (born 1965), Irish doctor and chief executive director of the WHO Health Emergencies Programme
 Michael J. Ryan (biologist), American biologist
 J. Michael Ryan, associate judge on the Superior Court of the District of Columbia
 Michael A. Ryan, U.S. Army general

See also
 Mick Ryan (disambiguation)